Pseudarctia nivea is a species of tussock moth in the family Erebidae. The genus Pseudarctia includes only this species, which was previously classified in the Arctiinae (subfamily of tiger and lichen moths) but later reclassified as a tussock moth (subfamily Lymantriinae). The species was described by Per Olof Christopher Aurivillius in 1899 and is found in Uganda.

References

Endemic fauna of Uganda
Moths described in 1911
Lymantriinae
Insects of Uganda
Moths of Africa
Monotypic moth genera